The Mining and Chemical Combine was established in 1950 to produce plutonium for weapons. It is in the closed city Zheleznogorsk, Krasnoyarsk Krai. The company is currently part of the Rosatom group.

The site had three underground nuclear reactors using cooling water from the Yenisei river: AD (1958), ADE-1 (1961) and ADE-2 (1965). ADE-2 was shutdown in 2010 in accord with the 1997 Plutonium Production Reactor Agreement with the United States. It also provided heat and electricity for the area, which was its main function after 1993.

The complex has an interim storage facility. There is also a 60 t/year commercial mixed oxide (MOX) fuel fabrication facility (MFFF). It employs 7000 people.

The MOX production line completed a 10 kg batch in September 2014.

The city has a Mining and Chemical Combine museum.

References

External links 
 
 

Rosatom
Nuclear weapons programme of Russia
Nuclear technology companies of Russia
Nuclear technology in the Soviet Union
Nuclear weapons program of the Soviet Union
Federal State Unitary Enterprises of Russia
Companies based in Krasnoyarsk Krai
Mining companies of the Soviet Union
1950 establishments in the Soviet Union